Amira El Sayed is an Austrian actress and author based in Vienna, Austria.

Amira El Sayed was born on the 3 June 1991 in Innsbruck, Austria. She is the only child of Erika El Sayed, an Austrian language and history teacher and Adel El Sayed, a university teacher and political scientist from Egypt. Amira was raised bilingual and is a native speaker of both Arabic and German. She spent her early years living in Alexandria, Egypt before she moved back to Innsbruck with her parents.

At the age of 16 Amira moved to Vienna where she later studied acting at the renowned Max Reinhardt Seminar. Amongst others she was taught by Klaus Maria Brandauer. She left University in the first year to play a part in Paul Schrader’s The Cleopatra Club, a theatre play directed by Rupert Henning, where she was discovered by her first agent.

Her first international film was 2016's A Hologram for the King, starring Tom Hanks  and directed by Tom Tykwer. In 2017, she went on to appear in the Swiss television series Wilder (SRF) and the Norddeutscher Rundfunk film Der Richter (director Markus Imboden). Her most recent work involves roles in Ransom in 2018, Deutschland 86 in 2018, Riviera (TV series) in 2019 and Hanna (TV series) in 2021.

Amira El Sayed is also the author of the book, titled Klang der Freiheit (The Sound of Freedom) which was published in 2013 by the Austrian publishing house Letter P. She currently lives in Vienna, Austria.

 Filmography 

 Publications 
 Klang der Freiheit'', Letter P, Vienna 2013, ISBN 978-3-9503168-4-1

References

External links 
 

Living people
Austrian actresses
1991 births
Actors from Innsbruck
Actresses from Berlin